This is a list of all full international footballers to play for Gabala FK. Players who were capped while a Gabala player are marked in bold. Players who gained their first International cap after leaving Gabala are not included.

International representatives

Current Gabala players

Former Gabala players

References
National Football Teams

Internationals
Gabala Internationals
Association football player non-biographical articles
Gabala